Pârâul Bradului may refer to the following rivers in Romania:

 Pârâul Bradului, a tributary of the Putna in Vrancea County
 Pârâul Bradului, a tributary of the Tecșe in Covasna County